Men in Black: The Roleplaying Game is a role-playing game written by George Strayton and published by West End Games in 1997.

Description
Men in Black: The Roleplaying Game was based on the first Men in Black film. The game used the D6 System.

Publication history
Men in Black: The Roleplaying Game was published by West End Games in 1997.

Publications for the game included:

 Men in Black (1997)
 The Director's Guide (1997)
 Aliens Recognition Guide #1 (1997)
 Introductory Adventure Game (1998)

Reception
The reviewer from Pyramid #28 (Nov./Dec., 1997) stated that "Using a dark sense of humor akin to that of their first RPG hit Paranoia, West End gives roleplayers all they need to become super-secret government agents charged with policing Earth's burgeoning (extra-terrestrial) alien population. Some 1,500 immigrants from the stars have immersed themselves in human society, using Earth as an apolitical middle ground, and the PCs constantly ride the ragged edge of disaster trying to keep the peace."

Reviews
Backstab #5

References

Comedy role-playing games
D6 System
Roleplaying Game
Role-playing games about conspiracy theories
Role-playing games based on films
Role-playing games introduced in 1997
Science fiction role-playing games
West End Games games